Thomas Dilly (22 April 1880 – 1953) was a Scottish footballer who played in the Football League for Bradford (Park Avenue), Derby County, Everton and West Bromwich Albion.

References

1880 births
1953 deaths
Scottish footballers
English Football League players
Association football forwards
Arbroath F.C. players
Everton F.C. players
West Bromwich Albion F.C. players
Derby County F.C. players
Bradford (Park Avenue) A.F.C. players
Walsall F.C. players
Shrewsbury Town F.C. players
Worcester City F.C. players
Kidderminster Harriers F.C. players